Social Democratic Youth may refer to:
 Social Democratic Youth of Denmark
 Social Democratic Youth (Finland)
 Social Democratic Youth (Lebanon)
 Social Democratic Youth (Mongolia)
 Social Democratic Youth (Iceland)
 Social Democratic Youth (Portugal)
 Social Democratic Youth (Romania)
 Social Democratic Youth (Serbia)
 Swedish Social Democratic Youth League

See also
 Young Social Democrats (disambiguation)
 Socialist Youth (disambiguation)

Political party disambiguation pages